Willow Park may refer to:

 Willow Park, Alberta (locality), neighbourhood in Parkland County, Alberta, Canada
 Willow Park, Calgary, neighbourhood in Alberta, Canada
 Willow Park School, Dublin, primary school in Booterstown, Ireland
 Willow Park School, New Zealand, primary school in Hillcrest, Auckland, New Zealand
 Willow Park, Texas, a city in the United States
 Willow Park, a fictional character in the animated fantasy series The Owl House

See also
 Willow Grove Park, amusement park in Willow Grove, Pennsylvania, United States from 1896 to 1976
 Willow River State Park, state park in Wisconsin, United States
 Willow Springs Water Park, water park in Little Rock, Arkansas, United States from 1928 to 2013